This article serves as an index - as complete as possible - of all the honorific orders or similar decorations received by the royal family of Tonga, classified by continent, awarding country and recipient.

Tongan honours

Orders 
 King Tupou VI  (18.03.2012 - )
  Grand Master of the Royal Order of Pouono  
  Grand Master of the Royal Order of King George Tupou I
  Grand Master of the Most Illustrious Order of Queen Salote Tupou III - Knight Grand Cross (31.7.2008) 
  Grand Master of the Royal Order of the Crown of Tonga
  Grand Master of the Royal Order of the Phoenix
  Grand Master of the Royal Military Order of St. George
  Grand Master of the Most Devoted Royal Household Order of Tonga - Knight Grand Cross (1.8.2011) 
 Queen Nanasipauʻu Tukuʻaho : 
  King George Tupou V Royal Family Order (1.8.2011)  
  Knight Grand Cross with Collar of the Order of Queen Salote Tupou III (30.6.2015)
  Dame Grand Cross of the Most Devoted Order of the Royal Household Order of Tonga
 Crown Prince Tupoutoʻa ʻUlukalala : 
  Knight Grand Cross of the Order of Queen Salote Tupou III (31.7.2008) 
  Knight Grand Cross with Collar of the Order of Queen Salote Tupou III (30.6.2015) 
 Crown Princess Sinaitakala Fakafanua :
  King George Tupou V Royal Family Order (1.8.2011) 
  Dame Grand Cross of the Most Devoted Order of the Royal Household Order of Tonga 
 Princess Lātūfuipeka Tukuʻaho : 
  King George Tupou V Royal Family Order of Tonga (1.8.2011) 
 Princess Salote Mafileʻo Pilolevu Tuita :
  Knight Grand Cross of the Royal Order of the Crown of Tonga (31.7.2008) 
  King George Tupou V Royal Family Order (1.8.2011) 
 Captain Siosaʻia Maʻulupekotofa Tuita, 9th Tuita
  Knight Grand Cross of the Most Illustrious Order of Queen Salote Tupou III (31.7.2008) 
 Princess Mele Siuʻilikutapu Tuku'aho [ Princess Mele Siuʻilikutapu Kalaniuvalu-Fotofili] (Prince Sione Ngu's eldest daughter)
  Knight Grand Cross with Collar of the Most Illustrious Order of Queen Salote Tupou III (31.7.2008) 
  Knight Grand Cross with Collar of the Royal Order of the Crown of Tonga (31.7.2008) 
  King George Tupou V Royal Family Order  (1.8.2011) 
 Princess Sinaitakala 'Ofeina-'e he-Langi Tuku'aho [Princess Sinaitakala Fakafanua]  (Prince Sione Ngu's 4th daughter and Crown Princess' mother)
  King George Tupou V Royal Family Order (1.8.2011)

Decorations
  King Taufa’ahau Tupou IV Coronation Silver Jubilee Medal (4.7.1992)  
  King George Tupou V Coronation Medal (1.8.2008) 
  King Tupou VI Coronation Medal (4.7.2015) 
  Tonga Defence Services General Service (Bougainville) Medal 
  Tonga Defence Services Long Service and  Good Conduct Medal  
  'Uluafu Gold Medal of Merit (September 1971)

Asian foreign honours

Japan
 Princess Salote, Princess Royal: Paulownia Dame Grand Cordon of the Order of the Precious Crown

References 

Tongan monarchy
Orders, decorations, and medals of Tonga
History of Tonga
Tonga